Rodolfo Antonio Echeverría Ruiz (born 19 June 1946) is a Mexican politician and diplomat from the Institutional Revolutionary Party. He has served as Deputy of the XLIX, LV and LVIII Legislatures of the Mexican Congress representing the Federal District.

He has also served as Ambassador of Mexico to Cuba from 1982 to 1985 and to Spain from 1994 to 1998.

References

1946 births
Living people
Politicians from Mexico City
Presidents of the Chamber of Deputies (Mexico)
Institutional Revolutionary Party politicians
Ambassadors of Mexico to Cuba
Ambassadors of Mexico to Spain
21st-century Mexican politicians
Deputies of the LVIII Legislature of Mexico
Members of the Chamber of Deputies (Mexico) for Mexico City